There are Great Western Hotels in several places, deriving their name from the Great Western Railway. These include
Great Western Hotel (Newquay), in Cornwall
Hilton London Paddington, formerly Great Western Hotel
Malmaison Hotel, Reading, formerly Great Western Hotel